The 2019 IIHF U18 World Championship Division II were two international under-18 ice hockey tournaments organised by the International Ice Hockey Federation. The Division II A and Division II B tournaments represent the fourth and the fifth tier of the IIHF World U18 Championship.

Division II A

The Division II A tournament was played in Elektrėnai, Lithuania, from 7 to 13 April 2019.

Participants

Final standings

Results
All times are local. (Eastern European Summer Time – UTC+3)

Awards
Best Players Selected by the Directorate
 Goaltender:  Nikita Kuzminov
 Defenceman:  Szymon Bieniek
 Forward:  Kirill Lodeikin
Source: IIHF

Division II B

The Division II B tournament was played in Belgrade, Serbia, from 25 to 31 March 2019.

Participants

Final standings

Results
All times are local. (to 30 March: Central European Time – UTC+1, 31 March: Central European Summer Time – UTC+2)

Awards
Best Players Selected by the Directorate
 Goaltender:  Jowin Ansems
 Defenceman:  Ernesto Klem
 Forward:  Strahinja Vdović
Source: IIHF

References

IIHF World U18 Championship Division II
2019 IIHF World U18 Championships
2019
2019
International sports competitions in Belgrade
Sport in Elektrėnai
2018–19 in Lithuanian ice hockey
2018–19 in Serbian ice hockey
IIHF
IIHF
2010s in Belgrade